The Electoral district of Geelong North was an electoral district of the Victorian Legislative Assembly. It was largely replaced by the district of Lara in the redistribution before the 2002 election.

Members of Geelong North

Election results

See also
 Parliaments of the Australian states and territories
 List of members of the Victorian Legislative Assembly

References

Former electoral districts of Victoria (Australia)
1967 establishments in Australia
2002 disestablishments in Australia